Horseheads North is a census-designated place (CDP) in Chemung County, New York, United States. It is part of the Elmira Metropolitan Statistical Area. As of the 2010 census, the population of the CDP was 2,843.

Geography
Horseheads North is located on the northern side of the town of Horseheads at  (42.189774, -76.806351). It is bordered to the north by the town of Veteran and to the south by Horseheads village.

Newtown Creek, a tributary of the Chemung River which in turn flows into the Susquehanna River, forms part of the southeast boundary of the CDP.

New York State Route 14 passes through the area just west of the CDP.

Demographics

As of the census of 2000, there were 2,852 people, 1,091 households, and 833 families residing in the CDP. The population density was 1,239.1 per square mile (478.8/km2). There were 1,116 housing units at an average density of 484.9/sq mi (187.3/km2). The racial makeup of the CDP was 96.88% White, 0.84% African American, 0.14% Native American, 1.23% Asian, 0.04% from other races, and 0.88% from two or more races. Hispanic or Latino of any race were 0.46% of the population.

There were 1,091 households, out of which 35.1% had children under the age of 18 living with them, 64.0% were married couples living together, 10.0% had a female householder with no husband present, and 23.6% were non-families. 18.9% of all households were made up of individuals, and 9.2% had someone living alone who was 65 years of age or older. The average household size was 2.61 and the average family size was 3.00.

In the CDP, the population was spread out, with 26.6% under the age of 18, 5.4% from 18 to 24, 27.8% from 25 to 44, 25.6% from 45 to 64, and 14.6% who were 65 years of age or older. The median age was 40 years. For every 100 females, there were 90.6 males. For every 100 females age 18 and over, there were 89.3 males.

The median income for a household in the CDP was $50,182, and the median income for a family was $54,419. Males had a median income of $35,873 versus $26,852 for females. The per capita income for the CDP was $21,813. About 3.2% of families and 4.8% of the population were below the poverty line, including 4.7% of those under age 18 and 12.0% of those age 65 or over.

References

Census-designated places in New York (state)
Census-designated places in Chemung County, New York